The Republic of Croatia is administratively organised into twenty counties, and is also traditionally divided into four historical and cultural regions: Croatia proper, Dalmatia, Istria, and Slavonia. These are further divided into other, smaller regions.

Historical regions

Smaller regions

Banovina (or Banija)
is a region in central Croatia, situated between the rivers Sava, Una and Kupa.

Baranja
forms a small enclave between the region of Slavonia and the Republic of Hungary, it lies in the north east of Croatia. The rest of the region known as Baranja is located in Hungary.

Croatian Littoral (Hrvatsko primorje)
the maritime region of Croatia proper

Gorski kotar
the region occupies the area between the major cities of Karlovac and Rijeka (a.k.a. Fiume). The regions main city is Delnice. The river Kupa separates the region from the Republic of Slovenia in the north.

Konavle
forms a small subregion of Dalmatia in the very south of Croatia and stretches from the town of Cavtat up to the Prevlaka peninsula near Montenegro border.

Kordun
is a region in central Croatia, situated between Lika and Banovina.

Lika
lies at the cross-roads between continental and coastal Croatia. Apart from those that go through narrow region of Gorski Kotar to the north all Croatian roads that lead to the sea from Zagreb pass through Lika. One of Croatia's most famous national parks: the Plitvice Lakes National Park is located in this region.

Međimurje
is a small region in northern Croatia, situated between rivers Mura and Drava.

Moslavina
is a microregion located in the Croatian counties of: Zagreb County, Sisak-Moslavina County and Bjelovar-Bilogora County.
Its main cities are Kutina and Ivanić-Grad.

Podravina
is the Croatian region that lies around the river Drava along Croatia's northern border with Hungary.

Podunavlje
this region lies along the Croato-Serbian border in eastern Slavonia. The border follows the flow of the river Danube (Dunav) giving the region its name.

Posavina
the region is located around the river Sava that runs through central Croatia and then along the Croato-Bosnian border in southern Slavonia.

Prigorje
the region around Zagreb, roughly between Žumberak and Moslavina.

Syrmia (or Srijem)
this region is divided between Serbia and Croatia. In Croatia it is in the very east of the country.

Turopolje
a microregion in the Sava river valley south of Zagreb, with city of Velika Gorica in its center.

Hrvatsko Zagorje ("Croatian Upland", or simply Zagorje)
Hrvatsko Zagorje lies to the north  of the Croatian capital city: Zagreb. Other major cities include the world-famous archeological site of Krapina and the baroque town of Varaždin. Its northern border is the Republic of Slovenia and the regions of Podravina and Međimurje, to the east lies Slavonia and to the west lies Kordun and Gorski Kotar.

Dalmatinska Zagora ("Dalmatian Hinterland", or simply Zagora)
the hinterland region of Dalmatia.

References

 
Regions
Croatia